Versus is the third studio album by American rock band Emarosa. The album was released on September 9, 2014 through Rise Records and was produced by Brian McTernan. It is the band's last album to be released on this label. It is also the first album to feature vocalist Bradley Walden and the last to feature rhythm guitarist Jonas Ladekjaer, bassist Will Sowers, and drummer Lukas Koszewski.

Track listing

Personnel
Credits adapted from AllMusic.
Emarosa
 Bradley Walden – lead vocals
 ER White – lead guitar
 Jonas Ladekjaer – rhythm guitar
 Will Sowers – bass
 Lukas Koszewski – drums
 Jordan Stewart – keyboards

Additional personnel
 Brian McTernan – production, engineering, mixing
 Will Beasley – assistant engineering
 Paul Leavitt – mixing
 Ryan Smith – mastering
 Glenn Thomas – illustrations, layout

References

2014 albums
Rise Records albums
Emarosa albums
Albums produced by Brian McTernan